Krom Stone House and Dutch Barn is a historic home and Dutch barn located at Rochester in Ulster County, New York.  The property includes the stone house (ca. 1730), Dutch barn (ca. 1800), and shed (ca. 1870).  The main block of the house is a -story stone dwelling in a linear plan.  In 1966, the stone was covered in stucco.

It was listed on the National Register of Historic Places in 1999.

References

Houses on the National Register of Historic Places in New York (state)
Houses completed in 1730
Houses in Ulster County, New York
National Register of Historic Places in Ulster County, New York